is a 1983 Japanese Jidaigeki television series. The story is set in whole Edo period in Ōoku and is fiction set against a background of historical fact. The Ōoku was where thousands of women work for one Tokugawa shogun and the part the ladies lived in Edo Castle.

Cast

Tokugawa shogun and people of Ōoku
Komaki Kurihara as Oeyo (episode1-3,50,51)
Tomisaburo Wakayama as Tokugawa Ieyasu (episode1-2)
Katsuo Nakamura as Tokugawa Hidetada (episode1-3,8)
Masaya Oki as Tokugawa Iemitsu (episode3-8,10,11,13)
Naoko Otani / Misako Watanabe as Lady Kasuga
Mieko Takamine as Sosinni
Haruko Kato as Senhime (episode14-16)
Mitsuko Kusabue as Asukai (episode14-16)
Ken Tanaka as Tokugawa Ietsuna (episode14-16)
Masahiko Tsugawa as Tokugawa Tsunayoshi (episode18-20,22,23,25,26)
Yoko Tsukasa as Nobuko (episode18,19,21,-23,25,26)
Meiko Kaji as Uemonnosuke no Tsubone (episode22.23)
Shigeru Tsuyuguchi as Tokugawa Ienobu (episode26-29)
Ayumi Ishida / Kyoko Enami as Gekkoin
Isuzu Yamada as Yuri (episode33,34)
Takeshi Kaga as Tokugawa Yoshimune (episode31-37,39)
Toshiyuki Hosokawa as Tokugawa Ieharu
Tetsuro Tamba as Tokugawa Ienari (episode43)
Gaku Yamamoto as Tokugawa Yoshinobu

Others
Akiko Koyama as Yodo-dono (episode1)
Kenichi Kaneda as Tokugawa Tadanaga
Eitaro Ozawa as Tokugawa Mitsukuni
Mikijiro Hira as Matsudaira Nobutsuna (episode14)
Shigeru Kōyama as Sakai Tadakiyo (episode18)
Takahiro Tamura as Makino Narisada (episode20)
Akira Kume as Ando Tsushima
Teruhiko Aoi (episode18,19,22,25,26)
So Yamamura as Arai Hakuseki(episode27-29)
Shigeru Amachi as Manabe Akifusa (episode27,28, 31-34)
Yoshio Inaba as Arima Ujinori (episode37)
Kojiro Hongo as Ōoka Tadasuke (episode39)
Teruhiko Saigo as Abe Masahiro (episode45)
Asao Koike as Ii Naosuke
Hiroki Matsukata as Kirino Toshiaki (episode50,51)

Fictional Characters
Keiko Takahashi as Ohatsu
Yōko Nogiwa as Otowa (episode17)
Misako Tanaka as Okin
Kantaro Suga as Sekine Rokubei
Mieko Harada as Takigawa
Kumi Mizuno as Sakon (episode38)
 Shinjirō Ehara as Yamauchi Iganosuke
Hiroshi Koizumi (episode46)
Renji Ishibashi as Ginzo (episode46)
Yutaka Nakajima as Awashima (episode50,51)

References

1983 Japanese television series debuts
1984 Japanese television series endings
1980s drama television series
Jidaigeki television series
Cultural depictions of Tokugawa Ieyasu
Cultural depictions of Tokugawa Iemitsu
Cultural depictions of Tokugawa Yoshimune
Television series set in the 17th century